Burashan (also Romanized as Būrāshān; also known as Borāshān in Turkish) is a village in Bakeshluchay Rural District, in the Central District of Urmia County, West Azerbaijan Province, Iran. At the 2006 census, its population was 124, in 35 families.

References 

Populated places in Urmia County